Heidelberg-Altstadt station (also known as Karlstorbahnhof—"Karlstor station") is a station on the eastern edge of the old town of Heidelberg, Baden-Württemberg, Germany. Until 13 December 2008, the station was called Heidelberg Karlstor.

Station building

The original station building was built on the Neckar Valley Railway (Neckartalbahn) in 1872 and 1873 at Karlstor ("Charles’ Gate"), a gate at the eastern end of the old town (Altstadt). The present station building is the result of a reconstruction between 1934 and 1936. The building is a heritage-listed building.

In the meantime, it has been used as a municipal office building and, since 1995, it has housed the Kulturzentrum Karlstorbahnhof (“Karlstor station cultural centre”), which was established by Mayor Beate Weber. With a wide range of theatrical performances, concerts, readings and exhibitions and smaller festivals, it forms a significant part of the Heidelberg cultural landscape.

Transport services

Since 2004, the station has been a stop on the Rhine-Neckar S-Bahn network and a new platform was built near the former station building for it. The station was given its present name, Heidelberg-Altstadt at the 2008/2009 timetable change on 14 December 2008.

Bus services

The station is served by several local bus routes.

References

External links 

 Kulturzentrum Karlstorbahnhof

Rhine-Neckar S-Bahn stations
Railway stations in Germany opened in 1872
1872 in the Grand Duchy of Baden
Altstadt
Altstadt